Josep Maria Izquierdo Ibáñez (born May 15, 1967) is a Spanish professional basketball coach who is currently an assistant coach for Partizan Belgrade of the Serbian KLS, the Adriatic League and the EuroLeague.

Coaching career 
In 2013, head coach Željko Obradović added Izquierdo to the Fenerbahçe coaching staff as an assistant. Izquierdo left the Fenerbahçe following the departure of coach Obradović in 2020.

In August 2021, Izquierdo was named an assistant coach for Serbian team Partizan under Željko Obradović.

References

External links
 Josep Maria Izquierdo at acb.com

1967 births
Living people
Catalan basketball coaches
Fenerbahçe basketball coaches
Liga ACB head coaches
Joventut Badalona coaches
People from Badalona
Sportspeople from the Province of Barcelona
Spanish expatriate basketball people in Serbia
Spanish expatriate basketball people in Turkey
Spanish basketball coaches